The 1986 RAC British Saloon Car Championship was the 29th season of the championship, and the final under the name of The British Saloon Car Championship. Chris Hodgetts won the title with his class C Toyota Corolla.

Teams & Drivers
Guest drivers in italics.